Sevda Shishmanova (born June 2 1962 in Razgrad) is a Bulgarian producer, director and journalist.

Education 
Shishmanova studied Bulgarian Philology at Sofia University and documentary film directing at Krastyo Sarafov National Academy for Theatre and Film Arts.

Career 
Since 1992, she has worked on local and international television and radio assignments for Bulgarian National Television and Economedia Press Group including in Afghanistan, Pakistan, northern Iraq, Macedonia and Turkey.

She is the producer of the award-winning Bulgarian series Undercover for which she was nominated as best producer and the author of more than fifteen documentaries.

In 1996, along with cameraman Hirsto Obreshkov, Shishmanova was arrested in Diyarbakir and interrogated for two days.

From 2010 until 2017 she was program director of BNT 1.

Recognition 

 Member of Management Board, Programing director and Head of Film Production of Bulgarian National Television (2006–2010). 
 "Johns Hopkins University SAIS – Novartis International Journalism Award" 2001 for the documentary Unfinished War: Macedonia's Unresolved 'Albanian Issue'''.
 Unfinished War was nominated in top 10 for international journalism achievements.
 Director of Programme BNT1 and Head of Film Production (2010–2017)
 Member of the National Counsel of Cinema (2006–2008)
 Member of the International jury of Sofia Film Festival 2007
 Member of the International jury of Filmini / short movie  film festival 2008
 Member of the Jury of National Film Festival "Golden Rose" 2010
 Member of the Jury of International Students Film Festival "Early Bird" 2016
 Member of the International Jury of Master of Art Film Festival (2016–2017)
 Member of International Jury of Sofia Independent Film Festival

 Filmography 
 Undercover (2011-2016 5 seasons) as producer
 Fourth Estate (2013) as producer
 The Umbrella (2022) as director
 Remains of Life'' (2022) as director

References

External links 
 Personal Website
 

Bulgarian journalists
Bulgarian women journalists
Bulgarian television producers
Bulgarian television directors
Living people
Women television directors
1962 births
21st-century Bulgarian women writers